Rohusi is an island and a village in Jõelähtme Parish, Harju County in northern Estonia, located in the Kolga Bay. Since 1999, when a company owned by Tiit Vähi OÜ Merilaine bought it, the island has been a private property.

References

Estonian islands in the Baltic
Villages in Harju County
Gulf of Finland